Omophron americanum, the American round sand beetle, is a species of ground beetle in the family Carabidae. It is found in, as well as native to, North America, ranging across most of the United States and Canada, except British Columbia.

Omophron americanum has a broad and rather flat shape, with a length between 5.1 and 7.0 mm. Reddish-yellow with dark markings, its colour pattern is variable on its upper surface, with a darker, brown underside. It has a striated elytron, a V-shaped pale area on the frons, a punctuated metasternum, and two setae on the mesocoxa.

Its habitat is the immediate vicinity of usually standing waters, on bare or sparsely vegetated sandy or clay substrates. It exists in altitudes between 260 and 2,200 m.

Copulation occurs between April and May. The female is typically gravid (pregnant) between May and June. Omophron americanum moults and becomes teneral between July and September. It overwinters in the adult stage.

These beetles are gregarious. They also stridulate.

References

Further reading

 
 

Carabidae
Articles created by Qbugbot
Beetles described in 1831